The Engineer's Lover (Italian: 'L'amante dell'ingegnere) is a painting by Italian painter Carlo Carrà. It was finished during the metaphysical phase of the artist (1921). 

It portrays an enigmatic head of a maiden on a brown table, flanked by a green panel with a triangle and a compasses (symbols of rationalism). The black background contributes to underline the timeless atmosphere of the scene.

The painting belongs to Gianni Mattioli's collection.

1921 paintings
Paintings by Carlo Carrà